Ayoub Ezzaytouni (born 12 September 2001) is a French professional footballer who plays as a midfielder for Championnat National 2 club Stade Bordelais.

Career
Ezzaytouni made his professional debut with Châteauroux in a 3–0 Ligue 2 loss to Niort on 9 August 2019.

On 6 July 2022, Ezzaytouni signed with Stade Bordelais in Championnat National 2.

International career
Born in France, Ezzaytouni is of Moroccan descent. He was called up to represent the Morocco U20s at the 2021 Africa U-20 Cup of Nations.

References

External links

2001 births
French sportspeople of Moroccan descent
Footballers from Nîmes
Living people
French footballers
Moroccan footballers
Association football midfielders
LB Châteauroux players
Stade Bordelais (football) players
Ligue 2 players
Championnat National players
Championnat National 2 players
Championnat National 3 players